Ariyalai Sithivinayakar Temple or Sithivinayakar Kovil is an ancient temple located about  west of A9 Road, around  from Jaffna Town.  This was rehabilitated by Advocate Arulampalam circa 1918. This temple was visited by Mahama Gandi, Yogar Swami, Kunrakudi Adakal.

This temple land are being used as Sri Parvadhi Vidyasalai (School), Market, Agrarian Centre, Sidda Medicine centre, Now defunct Multipurpose Cooperative Society, Handloom center and Preschool.

External links
Ariyalai Siddhivinayakar Temple official website in Tamil

Hindu temples in Jaffna District
Ganesha temples